Pythium tracheiphilum is a plant pathogen infecting lettuce.

References

External links
 Index Fungorum
 USDA ARS Fungal Database

Water mould plant pathogens and diseases
Lettuce diseases
tracheiphilum